Lackavrea (rugged rock-slab) is a  isolated mountain in County Galway, Ireland. It is located to the east of the larger Maumturks range, which lies within the Connemara region.

See also
Maumturks
Twelve Bens
List of mountains in Ireland
List of Marilyns in the British Isles

References

External links
 Mountainviews: Lackavrea

Marilyns of Ireland
Mountains and hills of County Galway